Savant Lake railway station is located in the community of Savant Lake in Thunder Bay District in northwestern Ontario, Canada. The station is on the Canadian National Railway transcontinental main line; it is used by Via Rail and served by transcontinental Canadian trains.

External links

Via Rail stations in Ontario
Railway stations in Thunder Bay District
Canadian National Railway stations in Ontario